Kilgore College (KC) is a public community college in Kilgore, Texas. It has an annual enrollment in excess of 5,000 students and is accredited by the Southern Association of Colleges and Schools Commission on Colleges to award the associate degree. The college was established in 1935 at the height of the East Texas oil boom, and as such, is home to the East Texas Oil Museum which houses a large collection of memorabilia documenting this period of Texas history. It is also famous for having the first ever dance-drill team, the Kilgore College Rangerettes. The Rangerettes began in 1940 under the direction of the late Gussie Nell Davis Gussie Nell Davis as a first-of-their kind and have spurred a multi-billion dollar dance team industry.

Academics
In addition to preparing students for undergraduate degrees that are completed at 4-year colleges and universities, KC's programs also include continuing education, medical training and short-term and long-term workforce training. The college offers Associate in Arts and Associate in Applied Science degrees, as well as tech prep and certificate programs including welding, corrosion technology, process technology, surgical technology, pharmacy technology and much more.

Texas Shakespeare Festival
In June 1986, the Texas Shakespeare Festival opened its inaugural season at Kilgore College; the festival has called KC home for what will be 38 summers in 2023. The college provides financial support and facilities for the festival, which is a vital cultural asset for all of East Texas.

College service area

As defined by the Texas Legislature, the official service area of KC includes territory within the following school districts:
 Big Sandy Independent School District
 Carlisle Independent School District
 Gilmer Independent School District
 Gladewater Independent School District
 Hallsville Independent School District
 Henderson Independent School District
 Kilgore Independent School District
 Laneville Independent School District
 Leverett's Chapel Independent School District
 Longview Independent School District
 Mount Enterprise Independent School District
 New Diana Independent School District
 Overton Independent School District
 Pine Tree Independent School District
 Sabine Independent School District
 Spring Hill Independent School District
 Tatum Independent School District (except the part of the district that is located in Panola County)
 Union Grove Independent School District
 West Rusk Independent School District
 White Oak Independent School District

Notable alumni
Lyle Alzado, former professional All-Pro NFL football player
Rodney Carrington, comedian
Ricardo Colclough, former professional American football player
Ricky Collins, current CFL wide receiver
Jorge Diaz, former professional American football player
Francisco Elson, professional basketball player
Kevin Everett, former professional American football player
Thomas Herrion, former professional American football player
John Hill, former Attorney General, Secretary of State, and Chief Justice, Texas Supreme Court
Lane Johnson; current professional American football player; Philadelphia Eagles of the NFL
Derrick Lewis, former American football player; professional mixed martial artist, currently competing in the UFC
Dwayne Stovall; Cleveland, Texas business man and 2014 Republican primary candidate for the United States Senate against incumbent John Cornyn.
Marcus Thornton, professional basketball player, Houston Rockets of the NBA
Marvin White, professional American football player
Demorrio Williams, professional American football player
Jason Williams, current professional basketball player for Chorale Roanne Basket of the LNB Pro B
Darren Woodard, former professional American football player
LeJuandro 'Kai' Zeiglar an American football player in the now defunct Arena Football League.

Kilgore College gallery

References

External links 

 Official website
 
 
 

Two-year colleges in Texas
Universities and colleges accredited by the Southern Association of Colleges and Schools
Community colleges in Texas
Education in Gregg County, Texas
Education in Rusk County, Texas
Buildings and structures in Gregg County, Texas
Tourist attractions in Gregg County, Texas
Educational institutions established in 1935
1935 establishments in Texas
NJCAA athletics